Ahmet Haluk Koç (born 3 October 1954) is a Turkish politician who serves as the spokesperson and deputy leader of the Republican People's Party (CHP) since 2012. He was a Member of Parliament for Samsun between 2002 and 2015 and serves as an MP for Ankara's second electoral district as of 7 June 2015. He briefly served as deputy leader of the CHP between 22 May and 3 November 2010.

Early life and career
Born in Istanbul to a family originating from the Black Sea region of Turkey, Koç studied medicine at Ankara University and became a specialist concerning internal illnesses and hematology. He became a Docent in 1990 and a Professor in 1996. He has had an excess of 200 articles published worldwide and has served as the President of the Turkish Hematology Association. He has previously chaired the European congress on bone and blood transplants.

Political career
In the 2002 general election, Koç was elected as a CHP MP from Samsun. He was re-elected in 2007, 2011 and is facing re-election in June 2015. When Kemal Kılıçdaroğlu was elected leader of the CHP during the party's Ordinary Convention of 2010, Koç was appointed deputy leader of the party responsible for international relations. He resigned form this position on 3 November 2010. In 2012, he was reappointed deputy leader, this time responsible for public policy and concurrently serves as the party's spokesperson.

See also
Kemal Kılıçdaroğlu

References

External links
MP profile at the Parliament website
Collection of all relevant news items at Haberler.com
Collection of all relevant news items at En Son Haber
Twitter Account

1954 births
Living people
Deputies of Samsun
Ankara University alumni
Contemporary Republican People's Party (Turkey) politicians
Politicians from Istanbul
Members of the 24th Parliament of Turkey
Members of the 23rd Parliament of Turkey
Members of the 22nd Parliament of Turkey
Members of the 25th Parliament of Turkey
Members of the 26th Parliament of Turkey
Members of the Parliamentary Assembly of the Council of Europe